A nullah is a narrow valley.

Nullah or Nulla may also refer to:
Cronulla, New South Wales, nickname Nulla
Zero, nulla or the letter N as an unofficial Roman numeral (from the Latin word nulla, meaning "none", "nothing", or the number zero)
Nulla nulla, alternative name for Waddy, an Australian Aboriginal war club